Movri is a former municipality in Achaea, West Greece, Greece. Since the 2011 local government reform, it is part of the municipality of West Achaea, of which it is a municipal unit. It has a population of 4,605 as of 2011, and is named after the mountain range Movri. The seat of the municipality is in Sageika. Its area is 86.484 km².

Subdivisions
The municipal unit Movri is subdivided into the following communities (constituent villages in brackets):
Fragka (Fragka, Spaneika, Tsakonika)
Kareika (Kareika, Gomosto, Karamesineika, Rachi)
Krinos
Limnochori (Limnochori, Kalamaki, Kato Limnochori, Paralia Kalamakiou)
Myrtos (Myrtos, Giouleika, Pournari)
Sageika (Sageika, Apostoli, Bouteika, Gerouseika, Vrachneika, Stathmos)

References

External links
Municipality of Movri 

Populated places in Achaea